Jaime Lynn Herrera Beutler (born November 3, 1978) is an American politician who served as the U.S. representative for  from 2011 to 2023. The district is in southwestern Washington, lying across the Columbia River from Oregon's Portland metropolitan area. A Republican, Herrera Beutler was appointed to the Washington House of Representatives in 2007 and elected to that body in 2008. In 2010, she was elected to represent Washington's 3rd congressional district in Congress. Herrera Beutler was reelected five times before being defeated by primary challenger Joe Kent in 2022.

Herrera Beutler was one of ten Republicans to vote to impeach Donald Trump after the January 6 United States Capitol attack. During Trump's Senate trial, she issued a statement (after both sides had rested their cases) that House Minority Leader Kevin McCarthy had said that he spoke by phone with Trump during the Capitol riot, asking him "to publicly and forcefully call off the riot" and for help with resources to defend the Capitol. According to Herrera Beutler, McCarthy said that Trump insisted that the rioters were with Antifa, not his supporters; McCarthy rejected the assertion. Her statement, via Twitter, said, "That's when, according to McCarthy, the president said: 'Well, Kevin, I guess these people are more upset about the election than you are.'" The next day, lead House Impeachment Manager Jamie Raskin asked the Senate for permission to call Herrera Beutler as a witness.

Early life, education, and early career
Jaime Lynn Herrera was born in Glendale, California, the daughter of Candice Marie (Rough) and Armando D. Herrera. Her father is of Mexican descent, and her mother has English, Irish, Scottish, and German ancestry. She was raised in Ridgefield, where her father was a lithographer. She was home-schooled through ninth grade, and graduated from Prairie High School, where she played basketball. In 2004, Herrera earned a B.A. in communications from the University of Washington.

Herrera served as an intern in both the Washington State Senate and in Washington, D. C., at the White House Office of Political Affairs. In 2004, she was an intern in the office of Washington State Senator Joe Zarelli, who later supported her campaigns. She was a senior legislative aide to U.S. Representative Cathy McMorris Rodgers.

Washington State House of Representatives

2008 election
Herrera moved back to the 18th Legislative District to run for state representative, and was appointed to the Washington House of Representatives in 2007 to replace Richard Curtis, who resigned amid a sex scandal. She won the 2008 election to retain her seat with 60% of the vote.

Tenure
Herrera was elected as Assistant Floor Leader, the youngest member of her party's leadership in the State House. Her first sponsored bill gave tax relief to business owners serving in the military. Governor Christine Gregoire signed it into law on March 27, 2008.

During her time in the House, Herrera also opposed Senate Bill 5967, which mandated equal treatment of the sexes in community athletic programs run by cities, school districts, and private leagues.

Committee assignments
 Health Care and Wellness
 Human Services
 Transportation

U.S. House of Representatives

Elections

2010

Herrera ran for  when Democratic incumbent Brian Baird retired. She advanced to the general election with 28% of the vote, well ahead of fellow Republican candidates David Hedrick and David Castillo. State Representative Denny Heck, a Democrat, ranked first with 31% of the vote.

Herrera raised over $1.5 million in contributions, 62% of which came from individual contributors and 35% from political action committees. The biggest single contributor was construction and mining contractor Kiewit Corporation, which gave her campaign over $16,000.

During the campaign, she received support from state Republican leaders Cathy McMorris Rodgers and former U.S. Senator Slade Gorton. The Columbian called her "a rising star in the Republican Party". In October, Herrera was named one of Time Magazine's 40 under 40: "The Washington Republican survived a Tea Party challenge to win the GOP primary in the Evergreen State's 3rd Congressional District. Now Herrera, a 31-year-old Latina and former congressional staffer, has successfully recast herself as the outsider as she takes on a longtime Democratic pol in November."

In the November general election, Herrera defeated Heck, 53%–47%. She won five of the district's six counties. Heck later represented , serving alongside Herrera.

On December 22, 2010, she announced that she had taken her husband's name and would thenceforth call herself Jaime Herrera Beutler.

2012

Herrera Beutler announced her candidacy for reelection in January 2012. She quickly outraised her two opponents, Democrat Jon Haugen and Independent Norma Jean Stevens. She won the open primary with 61% of the vote. By the end of the campaign, she had raised more than $1.5 million to Haugen's $10,000. She defeated Haugen 60%–40%.

2014

Herrera Beutler ran for reelection in 2014. She faced Republican challenger Michael Delavar and Democratic challenger Bob Dingethal. Dingethal and Herrera Beutler advanced to the general election, where Herrera Beutler defeated Dingethal, 60% to 40%.

2016

In the nonpartisan blanket primary, Herrera Beutler finished first with 55.4% of the vote; Democrat Jim Moeller finished second with 24.4%. In the general election, Herrera Beutler won with 62% of the vote to Moeller's 38%.

2018

In the nonpartisan blanket primary, Herrera Beutler finished first with 40.9% of the vote; Democrat Carolyn Long, a political science professor at Washington State University's Vancouver campus, finished second with 36.6%. Combined, the Democrats in the primary received just over 50% of the vote. In the general election, Herrera Beutler defeated Long with 53% percent of the vote, the closest race since her first campaign. She was one of only two Republicans, the other being Don Young of Alaska, to win a seat west of the Cascades or on the Pacific Coast.

2020

Herrera Beutler received over 56% of the vote in the blanket primary and Long just under 40%, setting up a rematch between the two. In the general election, Herrera Beutler won by a larger margin than in 2018, defeating Long by about 13 points.

2022

Former Green Beret Joe Kent challenged Herrera Beutler in the 2022 top-two primary for Congress. A Trump supporter, Kent ran because of her vote to impeach Trump. Kent supports claims that the 2020 presidential election was fraudulent and has said that Trump bears no responsibility for the storming of the Capitol. In the nonpartisan blanket primary, Herrera Beutler failed to advance to the general election, losing to Kent and Democrat Marie Gluesenkamp Perez. On August 9, she conceded, saying, "I’m proud that I always told the truth, stuck to my principles, and did what I knew to be best for our country." Kent went on to lose the general election to Gluesenkamp Perez.

Tenure

In March 2011, Herrera Beutler introduced her first bill to Congress. The Savings Start With Us Act would reduce the salaries of members of Congress, the president, and the vice president by 10%.

After the birth of her daughter Abigail (who was diagnosed with Potter's syndrome) in July 2013, Herrera Beutler announced that she would still be active in the House for key votes, but would dedicate a good deal of time to Abigail's care.

In June 2014, Herrera Beutler proposed the Advancing Care for Exceptional Kids Act, which would help coordinate care for children met with medical complexities in Medicaid. The bill was passed by a committee, but did not get a vote on the House floor.

Herrera Beutler is a member of the Republican Main Street Partnership and the Congressional Western Caucus.

In the first impeachment of Donald Trump, on December 18, 2019, Herrera Beutler voted against both articles of impeachment, along with all other voting Republicans. On January 12, 2021, she announced her support for Trump's second impeachment, after the storming of the U.S. Capitol six days earlier, citing "indisputable evidence" that Trump had "acted against his oath of office". She blamed him for inciting the storming and upbraided him for continuing to push lawmakers to object to certifying the results of the presidential election rather than "doing anything meaningful to stop the attack". She called Trump's initial statement denouncing the violence "pathetic". Responding to claims that impeaching Trump would only "inflame Republican voters", Herrera Beutler said that as a Republican herself, she believed that she and other Republicans "will be best served when those among us choose truth". The next day, she and nine other Republican representatives voted to impeach Trump. In response to backlash from Republicans in her district over her vote, Herrera Beutler made several Twitter posts on January 15 expanding on her reasoning, citing "indisputable and publicly available facts" that proved Trump had engaged in impeachable conduct. She said Minority Leader Kevin McCarthy asked Trump to tell the rioters to cease and desist and Trump responded, "Well, Kevin, I guess these people are more upset about the election than you are." She told a CNN reporter that the quote showed that "either [Trump] didn't care, which is impeachable, because you cannot allow an attack on your soil, or he wanted it to happen and was OK with it, which makes me so angry."

In March 2021, she voted against the American Rescue Plan Act of 2021.

On November 30, Herrera Beutler voted in favor of H.R. 550: Immunization Infrastructure Modernization Act of 2021. The bill helps create confidential, population-based databases that maintain a record of vaccine administrations.

Committee assignments 
 Committee on Appropriations
Subcommittee on Labor, Health and Human Services, Education, and Related Agencies
Subcommittee on the Legislative Branch (Ranking Member)
Joint Economic Committee

Caucus memberships
 Congressional Hispanic Conference
 Republican Main Street Partnership
Republican Governance Group
Problem Solvers Caucus

Political positions
During the 117th United States Congress, which began in 2021, Herrera Beutler has voted with her party 90% of the time, ranking her the 35th most bipartisan member of the House. During Trump's presidency, Herrera Beutler voted in line with his position 79.7% of the time. Her partisan reputation has softened as her tenure in Congress has lengthened.

Bio-defense 
In 2019, the Alliance for Biosecurity, a consortium of companies that develop products to respond to national security threats, gave Herrera Beutler its 2019 Congressional Biosecurity Champion Award. The award is given once a year to a member of Congress who works to improve the country's ability to prevent and combat major bio-security threats to national security.

Budget 
In April 2011, Herrera Beutler voted for Paul Ryan's budget, which would have lowered taxes for the highest earners from 35% to 25% and made Medicare a voucher system.

Donald Trump 
In December 2019, Herrera Beutler voted against impeaching President Trump, saying that there was inadequate proof that he engaged in obstruction of justice and abuse of power. In 2021, she voted in favor of Trump's second impeachment in the wake of the 2021 storming of the United States Capitol, which she blamed him for inciting.

On May 19, 2021, Herrera Beutler was one of 35 Republicans who joined all Democrats in voting to approve legislation to establish the January 6 commission meant to investigate the storming of the U.S. Capitol.

Health care 
Herrera Beutler favors repealing the Patient Protection and Affordable Care Act (Obamacare). In March 2017, she said she would vote against the American Health Care Act, a Republican replacement for Obamacare, because of its adverse effects on children who depend on Medicaid.

Immigration 
After Trump implemented an executive order banning immigration from seven predominantly Muslim countries, The Seattle Times reported in January 2017 that Herrera Beutler "was vaguely critical of the order, without saying she opposed it or calling for any specific changes".

Herrera Beutler voted for the Further Consolidated Appropriations Act of 2020 which authorizes DHS to nearly double the available H-2B visas for the remainder of FY 2020.

Herrera Beutler voted for the Consolidated Appropriations Act (H.R. 1158), which effectively prohibits Immigration and Customs Enforcement from cooperating with the Department of Health and Human Services to detain or remove illegal alien sponsors of Unaccompanied Alien Children.

Iraq 
In June 2021, Herrera Beutler was one of 49 House Republicans to vote to repeal the AUMF against Iraq.

LGBT rights 
Herrera Beutler opposes same-sex marriage. In July 2022, she voted against the Respect for Marriage Act, which would establish federal protections for same-sex and interracial marriages. On December 8, 2022, she joined 38 other Republicans in the House and voted in favor of the final passage of the Respect for Marriage Act.

Sexual abuse
In November 2013, Herrera Beutler co-sponsored the Military Justice Improvement Act, which would address a rise in military sexual assaults. Under the act, the military chain of command would lose the power to evaluate and respond to such incidents. "Despite efforts by military leadership to address this serious issue, the problem remains", she said in a news release. "A Defense Department report found that fewer than one in six cases were being reported to authorities, often due to fear of retaliation by superiors. A quarter of the time, the perpetrators of these crimes were in the victims' direct chain of command."

In December 2017, Trump signed into law the National Defense Authorization Act (NDAA) for 2018, which included part of Herrera Beutler's and Suzan DelBene’s (WA-01) Child Abuse Accountability Enhancement Act (H.R. 1103). The act closed a legal loophole that denied justice to some survivors of child abuse.

Steve Bannon
On October 21, 2021, Herrera Beutler was one of nine House Republicans who voted to hold Steve Bannon in contempt of Congress.

Ukraine
In 2022, Herrera Beutler voted to provide approximately $14 billion to the government of Ukraine.

Post-congressional career 
After leaving Congress in January 2023, Herrera Beutler was hired by the Children's Hospital Association (CHA) as a strategic adviser.

Personal life
In August 2008, Herrera married Daniel Beutler, who worked for SeaPort Airlines. The couple lives in Camas, Washington. In December 2010, she announced that she had taken her husband's name, and would thenceforth be known as Jaime Herrera Beutler.

In May 2013, Herrera Beutler announced that she and her husband were expecting their first child. In June 2013, she announced that her unborn child had been diagnosed with Potter's Syndrome, an often fatal condition in which abnormally low amniotic fluid caused by impaired kidney function inhibits normal lung development. A stranger who read the news suggested that she try an experimental treatment: saline injections into her uterus that would enable the baby to develop without kidneys. She said she tried several hospitals, and told CNN that "most wouldn't even return her calls". Finally, a doctor at Johns Hopkins agreed to try this treatment. The results were instantaneous. For four weeks, she drove every morning from the District of Columbia to Baltimore for injections.

Herrera Beutler is the ninth woman in history to give birth while serving in Congress. On July 29, 2013, it was announced that her baby had been born two weeks earlier, at 28 weeks' gestation. The girl, Abigail, was born without kidneys, and became the first child in recorded medical history to breathe on her own without both kidneys. In a Facebook post, Herrera Beutler said, "She is every bit a miracle." On July 24, 2013, Herrera Beutler was absent for a roll call vote concerning the NSA, citing health reasons. When she revealed Abigail's birth, it was understood that it was her reason for missing what was considered an important vote.

In early December 2013, it was announced that Abigail would be going home from the hospital nearly six months after her birth. On February 8, 2016, at age two, she received a kidney from her father at the Lucile Packard Children's Hospital Stanford in California.

In May 2016, Herrera Beutler gave birth to a boy. In May 2019, she gave birth to her third child, a girl named Isana. Her husband is a stay-at-home father.

Electoral history

See also
 List of Hispanic and Latino Americans in the United States Congress
 Women in the United States House of Representatives

References

External links
 
 
 

|-

|-

1978 births
21st-century American politicians
21st-century American women politicians
American people of Irish descent
American politicians of Mexican descent
Female members of the United States House of Representatives
Hispanic and Latino American members of the United States Congress
Hispanic and Latino American state legislators in Washington (state)
Hispanic and Latino American women in politics
Latino conservatism in the United States
Living people
People from Glendale, California
People from Ridgefield, Washington
Republican Party members of the United States House of Representatives from Washington (state)
Republican Party members of the Washington House of Representatives
United States congressional aides
University of Washington College of Arts and Sciences alumni
Women state legislators in Washington (state)